are a Paris-based Japanese performance duo. Composed of singer , known for his signature blonde wig and prince persona, and dancer , known for her French maid/drag queen style, large blonde afro wig, and white-painted lips, Les Romanesques have appeared in many advertising campaigns in France, including for Mazda, and released several singles and albums. Their song "Théorème d'amour" was used in the independent production France Five. Les Romanesques also have appeared at various gay pride events, such as the 2009 Heritage of Pride and the 2010 PrideFest. The group achieved national fame in France after appearing on Incroyable Talent (France's Got Talent) in its 4th season. The YouTube posting of their performance became the #1 viewed video in all of France, and #4 worldwide. Ishitobi is a graduate of Keio University's economics program while Miyamae is a graduate of Waseda University's human sciences program.

TV and radio 
France
 M6 : La France a un incroyable talent
 ARTE : Juke Box Memories, Die Nacht - La Nuit
 Canal+ : Le Petit Journal
 Paris Première : Paris Dernière
 France 4 : Les Agités du bocal
 Virgin 17 : Baffie!
 Nolife : 101%, Tokyo Café
 Game One : Game Zone
 France Culture : Minuit dix
 Radio Nova : Nuits Zébrées
 Europe 1 : Baffie!
 Radio Campus Paris : La chambre à air 

Japan
 NHK Educational TV : Otsuta-to-Denjiro(2013-)
 TV Asahi : Morning Bird!
 Kamen Rider Saber : Narrator/Character Tassel played by Ishitobi - several episodes
 TBS : Hiruobi!, Sittoko!, Arabiki Dan
 Fuji TV : Sonokao ga mitemitai, FNN Speak
 Nippon TV : Sekai Marumie TV Tokusoubu, NEWS Real Time
 TV Tokyo : Sekai wo kaeru Japan All-Stars
 TVK : Hama Luncho
 Hiroshima Home TV : Hobby no Takumi, Début -We Love Singing!
 J:com : Tsunagaru 7

CM 
 S. T. Corporation Air Wash (TV)
 Mazda (Web-CM)
 Bluetooth (Web-CM)
 H.I.S. FRANCE (Web-CM)
 KIOKO (Web-CM)

Songs 
 J'ai 17 ans
 Yokozuna - The King Of Sumotori
 Samurai Dandy
 Mademoiseeelle
 Zoun-Doko Bushi

References

External links

Official website
MySpace

French musical duos
Japanese musical duos